English Electric's K, RK and V type diesel engines were manufactured  by the English Electric company of the United Kingdom for stationary, rail transport and maritime use between 1934 and 1968.

History
Initially, the "K" type engine developed in the 1930s were offered in I4, I6, I7 and I8 variants, had 2-valve cylinder heads and ran at 600-680rpm. In 1940, turbocharging became an option, boosting power output by about 61%.

Due to the demand of more power, the Mark I "RK" (Revised K) and "V" type were introduced in 1947. The "V" type were built in V8, V12 and V16 configurations.

In 1951, the engines received 4-valve cylinder heads, thus creating Mark II "RK" and "V" types which ran at 750-900rpm. Intercooling was now optional, adding a "C" to the engine designation should it be equipped. More revisions saw the creation of the Mark III engines in 1962.

Unlike other comparable engines (and unusually for its size), EE used timing chains instead of timing gears. This was changed in 1968 with the introduction of the RK3 series by Ruston-Paxman after the demise of EE in the same year.

Nomenclature 
4, 6, 7, 8, 12, 16 - Cylinder count
C - Intercooler
S - Supercharged (actually turbocharged)
K, RK, V - Engine type
M, T - Intended purpose
M - Maritime
T - Rail Traction

Variants

References 

Diesel locomotive engines
English Electric locomotives
Engines by maker